Edward "Ed" Fouhy (November 30, 1934 – May 13, 2015) was an American journalist and television news executive.

Biography
Fouhy was born in Boston on November 30, 1934, and grew up in neighboring Milton. His father, Joseph, was a payroll clerk at Fore River Shipyard in Quincy. His mother Mary was a medical secretary at Massachusetts General Hospital. He was graduated in 1956 on University of Massachusetts in Amherst. He launched his broadcast career as news director for WBZ-TV. He was starting as producer of CBS Morning News in 1966.

References

External links

1934 births
2015 deaths
People from Boston
People from Chatham, Massachusetts